Barni is a commune in Como, Lombary, Italy. Barni may also refer to:
Barni (name)
 Barni dates
Barni, Himachal Pradesh, a village in India

See also
Barny
Barney